Frida is a 2002 biographical film about Mexican painter Frida Kahlo, directed by Julie Taymor. It was adapted from Hayden Herrera's 1983 Frida: A Biography of Frida Kahlo by Clancy Sigal, Diane Lake, Gregory Nava and Anna Thomas. Actress Salma Hayek was cast as Kahlo, while Alfred Molina portrays her husband Diego Rivera. The film premiered at the Venice Film Festival on August 29, 2002, where it competed for the Golden Lion. Frida then went on to play at the Toronto International Film Festival and the Chicago International Film Festivals. The film received a limited release in the United States from October 25, 2002. As of October 2012, Frida has earned over $56 million in its total worldwide gross at the box office.

Frida garnered various awards and nominations following its release, with most of the nominations recognising Hayek and Molina's performances, composer Elliot Goldenthal's score and the hair and makeup teams. The film received six nominations from the 75th Academy Awards and came away with two awards for Best Makeup and Best Original Score respectively. The American Film Institute  placed Frida on their Top Ten Movies of the Year list, as did the National Board of Review of Motion Pictures. The film received four nominations from the British Academy Film Awards and Judy Chin, Beatrice DeAlba, John E. Jackson and Regina Reyes went on to win the BAFTA Award for Best Makeup and Hair.

For their performances as Kahlo and Rivera, Hayek and Molina were nominated for Best Actress and Best Supporting Actor at the Broadcast Film Critics Association, Chicago Film Critics Association and the Screen Actors Guild Awards. At the Imagen Awards, Hayek and Molina won Best Actress and Best Actor respectively, while the film won Best Drama Picture. Hayek was also nominated for Best Actress at the 60th Golden Globe Awards and named Best International Actress by the Goldene Kamera. Goldenthal gathered a total of five awards for his score, including a Golden Globe, Satellite Award and the World Soundtrack Award for Best Original Score of the Year. "Burn It Blue", an original song written by Goldenthal and Taymor for the film, earned two award nominations.

Frida's hair stylists and makeup artists earned four nominations at Make-Up Artists and Hair Stylists Guild, but came away empty handed. Costume designer Julie Weiss won a Satellite Award for Best Costume Design, before going on to garner a nomination from the Costume Designers Guild. Jeremy Dawson and Daniel Schrecker received a nomination for Best Supporting Visual Effects in a Motion Picture from the Visual Effects Society.

Awards and nominations

References
General

Specific

External links
 

Lists of accolades by film